Empire Pool may refer to:

 Empire Pool, the original name for Wembley Arena at Wembley Park in the London Borough of Brent
 Empire Pool, Vancouver, a swimming pool built for the 1954 British Empire and Commonwealth Games
 Wales Empire Pool, an international swimming pool in Cardiff (demolished 1998)